Below is the list of the Municipal Mayors of Boac, Marinduque since the Philippines gained independence in 1898.

List
 22nd Mayor of Boac 
 1978 - 1980
 Pablo N. Marquez
 After Mayor Cesar Nepomuceno's one term Myaor Jose M. Madgrial was re-elected Mayor of Boac 1963-67
 Cesar Nepomuceno served from 1959- 1963 
 Mayor Jose Madrigal 1963to 67
 Mayor dominador Leonida 1967 to 78
 Vice Mayors:
 Present - robert Opis
 For Cesar L. Nepomuceno - vice Mayor Salvador Jamilla
 For Mayor Jose Montelyola Madrigal's last term = vice Mayor Dominador Leonida
 For Mayor Dominador Leonida - Voce Mayro Alfonso Hidalgo
 For Mayor Remdios Festn -VM Dr. Leva
 Mayor Pedrito Nepomuceno vice Mayor Antonio Barorro
 Mayor Dominador Leonida - Vice Mayor Aljandro Solomon
 Mayor Alejandro B. Solomon - vice Mayor alfonso Labay
 Mayor Alfonso Labay Vice Mayor Dahlia Mirafuente Jandusay

References

Politics of Marinduque